Gypsy Queen may refer to:

Songs
 "Gypsy Queen", a 1970s song written by Australian musicians Greg Quill and Kerryn Tolhurst, and recorded by Australian band Country Radio
 "Gypsy Queen", a 20th-century song written by Hungarian jazz guitarist Gábor Szabó
 "Gypsy Queen", a song by the Romanian house-music band Sunrise Inc.
 "Gypsy Queen", a song from the 1977 album Rock City by the American heavy-metal band Riot
 "Gypsy Queen", a song from the 1970 album His Band and the Street Choir by the Northern Irish musician Van Morrison
 "Gypsy Queen (Parts 1 & 2)", a song from the 1979 album Gypsy by the American progressive-rock band Gypsy

Other
 Gypsy Queen, a title given to female Gypsies considered leaders within their community, and/or through inheritance of title
The Gypsy Queen, a 1913 American short comedy silent film starring Fatty Arbuckle
 Gypsy Queen, a brand of tobacco made by Goodwin & Company
 de Havilland Gipsy Queen, a six-cylinder aircraft engine

See also
 The Gypsy Queens, a French pop-music band